Kukur Tihar (also called Narak Chaturdashi) is an annual Hindu festival originating from Nepal which falls on the second day of the festival of Tihar (around October or November). On this day, people worship dogs to please Yama, the god of death, as they are considered to be his messengers. Dogs are decorated with tilaka and wear flower garlands around their necks. Worshippers offer them various foods including meat, milk, eggs, and dog food. It is considered a sin if someone acts disrespectfully to a dog on this day.

Kukur Tihar is also celebrated worldwide by the Nepalese diaspora.

Background 

Tihar is a five-day-long Hindu festival originating from Nepal; it is the second-largest festival in the country, after Dashain. Kukur Tihar is celebrated on the second day of Tihar. During the festival of Tihar, many animals including cows and crows are also worshipped.

In the ancient Sanskrit epic Mahabharata, the five Pandavas on their way to heaven are accompanied by a dog. The five Pandavas with their wife Draupadi and brothers climb the Himalayas; all of them except Yudhishthira and his dog perishing along the way. Then Yudhishthira meets Indra, King of the gods, who welcomes him to heaven but tells him he has to leave his dog behind. Yudhishthira refuses to enter heaven without his dog and says he will go back to earth. The dog disappears and it is replaced by Yama, the god of death; Indra is impressed by his actions and then his righteousness opens the gates of heaven for Yudhishthira.

In Hindu mythology, Yama has two dogs—Shyama and Sharvara—who guard the door of hell. Nepali Hindus believe that by worshipping dogs they start to see death positively, because a dog follows them in their final journey. They hope that dogs will guard them against the torture in hell. Dogs are considered to be a companion of Yama and to please him, dogs are worshipped.

According to ABC Science, dogs might have been first domesticated in Nepal and Mongolia.

Celebrations

Tihar is celebrated around October or November every year. During the festival, dogs are worshipped, bathed, and  decorated with tilaka, which is made from kumkuma or gulal powders with rice and yoghurt. Flower garlands are draped around their necks and they are offered food including meat, milk, eggs, and dog food. Police dogs and stray dogs are also honoured. Kukur Tihar also celebrates the relationship between dogs and humans. It is considered a sin if someone behaves disrespectfully to a dog on this day.

Reception 
After the April 2015 Nepal earthquake, Animal Nepal used the occasion of the festival to promote awareness about dogs who became homeless. The Kathmandu Post reported that people were buying foreign breeds of dogs which left the local dogs in the streets.

Kukur Tihar spread around Mexico in 2016 to make people aware of respecting animals. Special Broadcasting Service reported that many Nepalis in Australia were also celebrating the festival. In 2008. Asian Art in London celebrated the festival by creating a dog walk charity event. Also in 2016, Kathmandu Metropolitan City with the help of Humane Society International and Jane Goodall Institute Nepal created a program to "humanely manage urban dog population". An educational assessment done by International Companion Animal Management Coalition (ICAM Coalition) found that dogs in the capital of Nepal were "generally healthy and accepted by the community".

In 2018, a dog named Kushal was named "The Best Dog of the Year" by the Nepal Police on the occasion of the festival after the dog helped discover the murderer of a 10-year-old girl.

After the Chinese Lychee and Dog Meat Festival, in which festival-goers eat dog meat and lychees, garnered international outrage, One Green Planet described Kukur Tihar as "[it] will restore your faith in humanity". People on social media contrasted the Chinese festival with Kukur Tihar and The Dodo reported that "[it gave] heartbroken dog lovers a reason to feel hopeful again". In a 2016 newspaper article, the President of Animal Nepal appealed to Nepalis "to take a pledge this Kukur Tihar, to not just worship your pets on this day but to do the right thing for them all year round. Unchain and uncage your dogs, learn to interact with them, take them for walks, understand their feelings, …" A 2007 BBC photo essay also pointed out the need to improve the treatment of Nepali dogs which, "during the rest of the year, are not generally well treated..."

Gallery

See also 

 Tihar
 Dashain
 Ghode Jatra

References 

Dogs in Hinduism
Festivals in Nepal
Mythological dogs
November observances
October observances
Hindu festivals in Nepal
Public holidays in Nepal
Hindu festivals